Benjamin "Benny" Williams (c. 1890 – 1924), better known as Black Benny, was a drummer from New Orleans.

Williams grew up in a rough poor African-American neighborhood in the Third Ward of New Orleans known as "The Battleground". He was in and out of jails for much of his life. In addition to his work as a drummer, Williams was a bouncer and a prizefighter.

An early colleague of Louis Armstrong, Williams is referred to in Armstrong's autobiography and helped look after Armstrong during his childhood. Sidney Bechet talks about Black Benny Williams in his autobiography, as does Jelly Roll Morton in his Library of Congress interviews.

Williams was stabbed in a dispute on July 2, 1924 by a woman named Helena Lewis. By the time he arrived at Charity Hospital that day, "he had lost a significant amount of blood. His heart was sliced open. And he had no pulse. Doctors went to work on him anyway." A surgeon used four stitches to sew up Williams' heart, then transfused a pint of blood from Williams' sister. Williams then 
woke up and began to talk. However, an infection set in. He developed pneumonia, and died on July 6. His assailant, Helena Lewis, was shot in an altercation with another woman later that same month. She died at Charity Hospital on July 20.

References

Sources
 
 Bechet, Sidney, Treat it Gentle, Da Capo Press; 2nd ed. edition (March 5, 2002); 

Dixieland drummers
Jazz musicians from New Orleans
American jazz drummers
1924 deaths
Tuxedo Brass Band members
Year of birth uncertain